Peter Robb-King is an English make-up artist. He was nominated for an Academy Award in the category Best Makeup and Hairstyling for the 1985 film Legend.

References

External links 

Living people
Year of birth missing (living people)
Place of birth missing (living people)
British make-up artists